The Fibera KK-1e Utu (English: Mist) is a Finnish mid-wing, T-tailed, single-seat, FAI Standard Class glider that was designed by Ahto Anttila and produced by Fibera in the 1960s.

Design and development
The KK-1e was one of the first fibreglass sailplanes produced, first flying in 1964.

The KK-1e has a  span wing, with a single spar. The wing employs a NACA 63-618 airfoil at the wing root, changing to a NACA 63-612 section at the wing tip. The wing features a split terminal velocity trailing edge combination spoiler/dive brake. The landing gear is a fixed monowheel.

The aircraft was not type certified and the one aircraft imported into the United States was registered with the Federal Aviation Administration in the Experimental - Exhibition/Racing category.

Operational history
Only one KK-1e was imported into the United States in 1967. As of July 2011 this aircraft was still registered with the FAA to its original owner.

Aircraft on display

Finnish Aviation Museum - 2
Karhulan ilmailukerho Aviation Museum - 1

Specifications (KK-1e)

See also

References

External links
Photo of a KK-1e
Photo of a KK-1e

1960s Finnish sailplanes